Better Luck Next Time is the debut album release from UK artist and producer Mark Hill, working under the moniker The stiX. It was released on April 18, 2005.

The first single released from the album was Young & Foolish, which features UK soul artist Corinne Bailey Rae.

Track listing
All tracks produced by Mark Hill.
"The Eye"
"Young & Foolish"
"Breathless"
"You Should Know"
"Never Too Late"
"The Only One"
"Lover In You"
"Let It Go"
"Leave Her Alone"
"Can't Complain"
"Spiritual Love"
"Million Miles"
"Kaya's a ginge..!!"

See also
 The stiX
 Corinne Bailey Rae
 Mark Hill
 The Artful Dodger

External links
 The stiX Official Site

2005 albums